Jean-Jacques Rocchi (born 1 June 1989) is a French professional footballer who plays as a midfielder for  club Annecy.

Club career
Born in the town, Rocchi spent his youth career with Bastia. In June 2011 he left to sign for Compiègne. After a four months he returned to Corsica and joined in September 2009 to Calvi.

Following Calvi's decision to withdraw from the CFA, Rocchi signed with Sedan.

In June 2016, after three seasons and back-to-back promotions with Sedan, Rocchi signed a two-year deal with Championnat National side USL Dunkerque.

Rocchi signed for Annecy in the Championnat National 2 in June 2018, agreeing a three-year contract.

International career
Rocchi is a member of the unofficial Corsica national team.

References

External links
 

1989 births
Living people
Sportspeople from Bastia
French footballers
Footballers from Corsica
Association football midfielders
Corsica international footballers
SC Bastia players
AFC Compiègne players
FCA Calvi players
CS Sedan Ardennes players
USL Dunkerque players
FC Annecy players
Ligue 2 players
Championnat National players
Championnat National 2 players
Championnat National 3 players